Harry Lane Englebright (January 2, 1884 – May 13, 1943) was a U.S. political figure. He served as a Congressman from California's 2nd congressional district from 1926 to 1943, and as the House Minority Whip between 1933 and 1943.

Englebright was born in Nevada City, California. His father, William F. Englebright was a politician who served in the United States House of Representatives. Harry Englebright attended the University of California, Berkeley and became a mining engineer before entering politics, connected with various mining enterprises in California and was an engineer for the State Conservation Commission from 1911 to 1914.

Englebright was elected to the United States House of Representatives in a special election in 1926, following the death of congressman John E. Raker. His district was located in the far north of California, north of Sacramento. He was a Republican. He was elected to a full term later in 1926 and was re-elected until his death in 1943 in Bethesda, Maryland.

Englebright Lake in Northern California is named for him.

See also
 List of United States Congress members who died in office (1900–49)

References

External links

1884 births
1943 deaths
University of California, Berkeley alumni
People from Nevada City, California
American mining engineers
Republican Party members of the United States House of Representatives from California
20th-century American politicians
Engineers from California